Marcelo Demoliner and Franko Škugor were the defending champions, but lost in the quarterfinals to Kevin King and Juan-Carlos Spir.

Juan Sebastián Cabal and Robert Farah won the final 7–6(7–3), 6–3 against Kevin King and Juan-Carlos Spir.

Seeds

Draw

Draw

References
 Main Draw

Bucaramanga Open - Doubles
2014 Doubles